Arver v. United States, 245 U.S. 366 (1918), also known as the Selective Draft Law Cases, was a United States Supreme Court decision which upheld the Selective Service Act of 1917, and more generally, upheld conscription in the United States. The Supreme Court upheld that conscription did not violate the Thirteenth Amendment's prohibition of involuntary servitude, or the First Amendment's protection of freedom of conscience.

The Solicitor General's argument, and the court's opinion, were based primarily on Kneedler v. Lane, which was actually multiple opinions of the Supreme Court of Pennsylvania during the American Civil War that upheld the Enrollment Act, and Vattel's The Law of Nations (1758). The reliance on the Kneedler v. Lane decisions of the Pennsylvania Supreme Court have been questioned on multiple occasions.

As reasoning for its decision, laws of the following governments of sovereign states were given as listed in The Statesman's Yearbook for 1917 as enforcing military service:

 Argentina
 Austria-Hungary
 Belgium
 Brazil
 Bulgaria
 Bolivia
 Canada
 Colombia
 Chile
 China
 Denmark
 Ecuador
 El Salvador
 France
 Greece
 Germany
 Guatemala
 Honduras
 Italy
 Japan
 Mexico
 Montenegro
 Netherlands
 Nicaragua
 Norway
 Peru
 Portugal
 Romania
 Russia
 Serbia
 Siam
 Spain
 Switzerland
 Turkey

References

External links
 
 
1918 in United States case law
Conscription in the United States
Conscription law
United States Supreme Court cases
United States Supreme Court cases of the White Court
United States Thirteenth Amendment case law
United States in World War I